Prima Cool is a private Czech television station.

Prima Cool is TV Prima's second channel. It is targeted primarily at young male audiences.

Prima Cool launched on 1 April 2009 as TV Prima's new digital channel. It is available on Czech DVB-T multiplex 2, where it is freely broadcast (covering up to 72% of the population of the Czech republic, mainly in Bohemia).  The channel is also broadcast through DVB-S on satellite Astra 1G, and available on cable TV (in all packages, due to the must-carry law). It is also known as "Ninja Warrior"

Ratings 
 Ratings in December 2009 were about a 1.3% share (eighth/ninth place).
 Ratings in April 2010 were a more than 2.0% share (eighth/ninth place).
 Ratings in June 2011 were a more than 3.9% share  (sixth/seventh place).
 Ratings in March 2012 were a more than 6.5% share  (fourth place)

Programming
30 Rock
American Chopper
Angel
Back To You
Blade: The Series
Bob's Burgers
Boston Public
Brainiac: History Abuse
Brainiac: Science Abuse
Buffy the Vampire Slayer
Burn Notice
Charmed
Chuck
Conviction
Criss Angel: Mindfreak
Dexter
Dollhouse
Eureka
Extreme Makeover
Extreme Makeover: Home Edition
Family Guy
Fear Factor
Frasier
Futurama
Glee
Heroes
How I Met Your Mother
Journeyman
K-Ville
Long Way Round
Mad Men
Maximum Exposure
My Name Is Earl
Nip/Tuck
Outsourced
Psych
Raines
Sasuke
Scrubs
Shark
Son of the Beach
Sons of Anarchy
Star Trek: Enterprise
Star Trek: The Next Generation
Star Trek: Discovery
Supernatural
Survivor (U.S. TV series)
Stargate SG-1
Stargate: Atlantis
Stargate: Universe
Takeshi's Castle
Terminator: The Sarah Connor Chronicles
Terra Nova
The Big Bang Theory
The Class
The Cleveland Show
The Drew Carey Show
The Fresh Prince of Bel-Air
The Nine
The Office
The Pretender
The Simpsons
The Unit
The X-Files
Thief
Top Gear
Vanished
Who Wants to Be a Superhero?
Will & Grace
World's Most Amazing Videos
Xena: Warrior Princess

References

External links
 Official Site
 Program TV Prima Cool

Television stations in the Czech Republic
Czech-language television stations
Modern Times Group
Television channels and stations established in 2009
Prima televize